Swedish green marble, or simply Swedish green, is a marble from quarries in Kolmården, in the north-eastern part of the province of Östergötland in Sweden. It is fine-grained, with a variable green colour and attractive veining, due to serpentines in the stone. It is considered one of the hardest marbles in the world.

Swedish green has been used extensively in buildings and monuments in Sweden and abroad.

The main desk in the General Assembly building of the United Nations features the presiding officials rostrum constructed from green marble, with a matching wall behind it.

Notable buildings with Swedish green
Stadshuset, Stockholm
Stockholm Palace, Stockholm
Drottningholm Palace, Stockholm
Matchstick Palace, Stockholm
University Hall, Uppsala
Rockefeller Center, New York City
Paris Opera, Paris
Bennelong Apartments, Sydney

See also
List of types of marble

References

Official website Green marble

Marble
Södermanland